Kali Theatre is a theatre company that specialises in presenting plays by women of South Asian descent. Founded in 1991 by Rita Wolf and Rukhsana Ahmad, Kali tours plays across the United Kingdom. Helena Bell has been the theatres artistic director since 2016, succeeding Janet Steel.

Kali Theatre is supported by the Arts Council in recognition for "nurture strong individual writers who challenge perceptions through original and thought-provoking theatre".

History
In 1990, after reading about Balwant Kaur, a Sikh woman murdered by her husband in front of their children for running away to a women's refuge, Rita Wolf felt "outraged" that the story was not wider spread. Wolf found out about writer Rukhsana Ahmad, who was compelled to write about Balwant Kaur's story. Ahmad went on to write Song for a Sanctuary, Kali Theatre's inaugural production, which Wolf directed.

Kali was formed after repeated approaches to established venues and companies for help to produce the play failed. Due to this Wolf & Ahmad established Kali Theatre company with Wolf taking on the role of artistic director.

References

External links
Official website
Twitter
Instagram
Facebook

Theatre companies in the United Kingdom